Pierre Van Basselaere (born 26 June 1915, date of death unknown) was a Belgian basketball player. He competed in the men's tournament at the 1936 Summer Olympics.

References

External links

1915 births
Year of death missing
Belgian men's basketball players
Olympic basketball players of Belgium
Basketball players at the 1936 Summer Olympics
People from Anderlecht
Sportspeople from Brussels